Giuseppe Asti (31 July 1891 – 1970) was an Italian footballer who played as a forward.  He played for F.C. Internazionale Milano for 6 seasons, winning the Italian league championship in the 1919–20 season. He made his only international appearance for the Italy national football team on 28 March 1920 in a game against Switzerland.

External links
 

1891 births
1970 deaths
Italian footballers
Italy international footballers
Inter Milan players
Association football forwards
U.S.D. Novese players